PRINCE2 (PRojects IN Controlled Environments) is a structured project management method and practitioner certification programme. PRINCE2 emphasises dividing projects into manageable and controllable stages.

It is adopted in many countries worldwide, including the UK, Western European countries, and Australia.
PRINCE2 training is available in many languages.

PRINCE2 was developed as a UK government standard for information systems projects. In July 2013, ownership of the rights to PRINCE2 were transferred from HM Cabinet Office to AXELOS Ltd, a joint venture by the Cabinet Office and Capita, with 49% and 51% stakes respectively.

History
PRINCE was derived from an earlier method called PROMPT II (Project Resource Organisation Management Planning Techniques). In 1989 the Central Computer and Telecommunications Agency (CCTA) adopted a version of PROMPT II as a UK Government standard for information systems (IT) project management. They gave it the name 'PRINCE', which originally stood for "PROMPT II IN the CCTA Environment". PRINCE was renamed in a civil service competition as an acronym for "PRojects IN Controlled Environments". PRINCE2 is the second edition of the earlier PRINCE method which was initially announced and developed in 1989 by the Central Computer and Telecommunications Agency (CCTA), a UK government support agency. PRINCE2 was released in 1996 as a generic project management method. PRINCE2 has become increasingly popular and is now a de facto standard for project management in many UK government departments and across the United Nations system. There have been two major revisions of PRINCE2 since its launch in 1996: "PRINCE2:2009 Refresh" in 2009, and "PRINCE2 2017 Update" in 2017. The justification for the 2017 update was the evolution in practical business practices and feedback from PRINCE2 practitioners in the actual project environment.

Overview of PRINCE2

Six Aspects

These aspects are also called tolerances or performance goals. They quantify the project tolerance and are considered during decision-making processes. In some organisations these can be key performance indicators (KPIs). In the following table project level tolerances are summarised:

Benefits can have as target the cost of the benefit, but the cost tolerance above is related to the cost of the project, not the cost of the benefit.

Each management level is checked against these tolerances, coming from the upper level.

Seven Principles (why, or guidelines to follow) 
PRINCE2 is based on seven principles and these cannot be tailored. The PRINCE2 principles can be described as a mindset that keeps the project aligned with the PRINCE2 methodology. If a project does not adhere to these principles, it is not being managed using PRINCE2.
 Continued Business Justification: The business case is the most important document, and is updated at every stage of the project to ensure that the project is still viable.  Early termination can occur if this ceases to be the case.
 Learn From Experience: Each project maintains a lessons log and projects should continually refer to their own and to previous and concurrent projects' lesson logs to avoid reinventing wheels. Unless lessons provoke change, they are only lessons identified (not learned).
 Defined Roles and Responsibilities: Roles are separated from individuals, who may take on multiple roles or share a role. Roles in PRINCE2 are structured in four levels (corporate or programme management, project board, project manager level and team level). Project Management Team contains the last three, where all primary stakeholders (business, user, supplier) need to be presented.
 Manage by Stages: The project is planned and controlled on a stage by stage basis. Moving between stages includes updating the business case, risks, overall plan, and detailed next-stage plan in the light of new evidence.
 Manage by Exception: A PRINCE2 project has defined tolerances (6 aspects above) for each project objective, to establish limits of delegated authority. If a management level forecasts that these tolerances are exceeded (e.g. time of a management stage will be longer than the estimated time in the current management stage). It is escalated to the next management level for a decision how to proceed.
 Focus on Products: A PRINCE2 project focuses on the definition and delivery of the products, in particular their quality requirements.
 Tailor to Suit Project Environment: PRINCE2 is tailored to suit the project environment, size, complexity, importance, time capability and risk. Tailoring is the first activity in the process Initiating A Project and reviewed for each stage.
Not every aspect of PRINCE2 will be applicable to every project, thus every process has a note on scalability. This provides guidance to the project manager (and others involved in the project) as to how much of the process to apply. The positive aspect of this is that PRINCE2 can be tailored to the needs of a particular project. The negative aspect is that many of the essential elements of PRINCE2 can be omitted sometimes resulting in a PINO project – PRINCE in Name Only

Seven Themes (what, or tools to use)

Seven Processes (how, or roadmap start to finish)
 Starting Up A Project, in which the project team is appointed including an executive and a project manager, and a project brief is produced. 
 Initiating A Project, in which the business case refined and Project Initiation Documentation assembled.
 Directing A Project, which dictates the ways in which the Project Board oversees the project.
 Controlling A Stage, which dictates how each individual stage should be controlled, including the way in which work packages are authorised and distributed.
 Managing Product Delivery, which has the purpose of controlling the link between the Project Manager and the Team Manager(s) by placing formal requirements on accepting, executing and delivering project work.
 Managing Stage Boundaries, which dictates how to transition from one stage to the next.
 Closing A Project, which covers the formal decommissioning of the project, follow-on actions and evaluation of the benefits.

Management products
The PRINCE2 manual contains 26 suggested templates for documentation associated with the project, which it terms management products and which are divided into baselines, records and reports. Some examples of management products are:
 Benefits Management Approach (In 2009 Edition it was called Benefits Review Plan): defines how and when a measurement of the project's benefits, expected by the Senior User, can be made.
 Business Case: used to capture financial justification for the project. It is a PRINCE2 principle that a project must have continued business justification. As soon as a Business Case fails to make sense, change or stop that project.
 Checkpoint Report: a progress report created by the Team Manager and sent to the Project Manager on a regular basis to report the status of the Work Package.
 Communications Management Approach (In 2009 Edition it was called Communications Management Strategy): a description of the methods and frequency of communication to stakeholders, covering the flow of information in both directions to and from stakeholders (Information required to be provided from the project and information required to be provided to the project).
 Configuration Item Record: provides a record of the product History, Status, Version, Variant, Details of any relationships between items/products, and Product owner/Product copy holders.
 Change Control Approach (In 2009 Edition it was called Configuration Management Strategy): used to identify how the project's products will be identified, controlled and protected, this document is created by the Project Manager in the Initiating a Project process.
 Daily Log: used to record informal issues.
 End Project Report: reviews how the project performed against the original Project Initiation Documentation (PID)
 Issues Register: an issue log of notes about change requests, problems and complaints sent by all project members.
 Lessons Log: a set of notes of lessons learned which may be useful to future projects
 Project Brief: used by the Project Board to authorise the Initiation Stage (1st stage of the project). In the Initiating a Project process, the contents of the Project Brief are extended and refined and the Project Brief evolves to form the Project Initiation Documentation (PID)
 Quality Register: details of all planned quality control activities, dates, and personnel involved.
 Risk Register: a record of identified risks (threats and opportunities) relating to the project

Integration with other techniques
The 26 Management Products described by PRINCE2 are only used for the "high-level" management of the project. Within its tasks, task managers must still decide on their own project management framework.
Some suggestions given in the PRINCE2 manual are product based planning, change control, quality review technique, Gantt charts, PERT charts and critical path analysis.

PRINCE2 can also be used to manage projects that use agile software development methods.

Quality review technique

The quality review technique ensures a project's products are of the required standard (i.e. meet defined quality criteria). This takes place in a quality review meeting, which identifies errors in the product. The quality review meeting will not attempt to solve the problems it identifies. The meeting brings together people who have an interest in the project's outputs (or products) and people on the project team able to address issues identified.

History of PRINCE2 editions
Below is a list of all the editions of PRINCE2. As of 1 January 2020, "PRINCE2 2017" was renamed "PRINCE2 6th Edition". Also, the previous edition, "PRINCE2 2009" was renamed "PRINCE2 5th Edition". There were no other changes except the name of the brand. The reason for the name change was to "ensure the format of the name is aligned with that used by other frameworks within the project management industry". As list of all versions of PRINCE2 are printed in the cover of the PRINCE2 manual:

(*nth names added for other editions in order for context, but they were not referred to these names originally. However, they are referenced as such in the PRINCE2 manual cover page.)

Differences between 2009 and 2017 versions

PRINCE2 Agile
PRINCE2 Agile is a tailored form of PRINCE2, suitable for Agile projects that use Scrum, Kanban, or a similar Agile system in their delivery layer. It adds a management and governance layer on top of the relatively simple Agile methods that are focused on the delivery layer.

Basically it uses the following techniques:
 Cynefin framework to understand the complexity of the project to find out whether classical, process-based PRINCE2 or agile framework based PRINCE2 shall be used. It is used during the Starting Up a Project and Initiating a Project process.
 Agilometer as a vehicle to understand how much tailoring and agility to be used in the PRINCE2 project, with focus on estimating the risk response performance of the project. It is reviewed, eventually updated during the Managing Stage Boundary process.
 Scrum for timebox-based, Kanban for flow-based work package management.

PRINCE2 Agile was released in 2015 and are intended for those who work in development projects, while PRINCE2 AgileSHIFT from 2018 are intended for bringing the agile mindset to the other parts of an organisation than those who work directly on projects. Like the regular PRINCE2, both are available on the Foundation and Practitioner levels.

Training and certifications 
PRINCE2 certifications, awarded by AXELOS, require the user to undertake a training course with an Accredited Training Organisation (ATO) followed by an exam. The training and exam may be online or in person. AXELOS requires that any organisation providing official PRINCE2 training must go through an accreditation process in order to validate the quality of the course content and delivery. Once approved, the organisation can use the title Accredited Training Organisation (ATO). Trainers must be re-accredited every 3 years and undergo a surveillance check every 12 months.

There are four levels of certifications for PRINCE2: 
 PRINCE2® 2017 Foundation: confirms the holder has sufficient knowledge and understanding of the PRINCE2 method to be able to work in a project management team working with this method.
 PRINCE2® 2017 Practitioner: confirms the holder has achieved sufficient understanding of how to apply PRINCE2 in a scenario situation and will, with suitable direction, be able to start applying the method to a real project. Qualified PRINCE2 Practitioners who go on to study for the APMP qualification of the Association for Project Management (APM) are exempt from certain topics of the syllabus that are covered in the PRINCE2 Practitioner qualification. In the exam 38 out of 68 questions must be answered correctly (55%). If the examinee takes the exam in their native language, the exam duration is 150 minutes. Otherwise it is 188 minutes. The weighting of the questions: 35 questions from the theme, 25 questions from the processes, 8 questions from the principles. The test exams offered by Axelos and test centres include all the aspects of the real exam. It is strongly advised to the examinees to read the book and go through the test exam many times.
 PRINCE2 Agile® Foundation: was released in June 2018 and confirms the holder has sufficient knowledge and understanding of the PRINCE2 method and agile way of working and how agile can be combined to PRINCE2.
 PRINCE2 Agile® Practitioner: confirms the holder is able to apply the project management principles of PRINCE2 whilst combining agile concepts such as Scrum and Kanban.

The PRINCE2 certification is recognised globally for its practice- driven approach to project management. AXELOS publishes a successful candidate register which can be searched on the web. In the PRINCE2 certification, there are different level that are necessary for the application to pass for becoming certified PRINCE2 professional.

Advantages and criticisms
PRINCE2 provides a method for managing projects within a clearly defined framework, but project management is a complex discipline and using such a framework is no guarantee of a successful project.

Some of the advertised benefits of PRINCE2 are: increased quality of the finished products, efficient control of resources, avoidance of either "heroic" (under-regulated) or "mechanistic" (over-regulated) working, and increased confidence among the project team.

PRINCE2 is sometimes considered inappropriate for small projects or where requirements are expected to change, due to the work required in creating and maintaining documents, logs and lists. The deliverable structure may also lead to focus on producing deliverables for their own sake, to "tick the boxes" rather than do more useful work.

The general response of PRINCE2's authors to criticism has been to point out that the methodology is scalable and can be tailored to suit the specific requirements and constraints of the project and the environment. This strong emphasis on tailoring has led some users to complain that PRINCE2 is unfalsifiable, i.e. it is impossible to tell whether PRINCE2 "works" or constitutes "best practice" if any problems encountered with a project can be blamed on inappropriate application of PRINCE2 rather than on PRINCE2 itself.

The experiences of the Blair administration in the UK between 1997 and 2007 (and of subsequent UK governments) arguably undermine PRINCE2's claim to be "best practice", given the string of high-profile failed IT projects charged to the taxpayer during that time, and the controversy surrounding the financial relationship between the Blair government and PRINCE2's co-owners Capita. PRINCE2's training material addresses these failures, blaming them on inappropriate tailoring of PRINCE2 to the project environment, and advocating for more PRINCE2 training for government project managers to solve the problem.

Differences from PMP 
Project Management Professional (PMP) from Project Management Institute may be seen as a competitor of PRINCE2. In general, the UK, Australia prefer PRINCE2, and the US and American countries prefer PMP. Asia, Africa and the Middle East area have no strong preference for PMP or PRINCE2.
The important thing is that PMP (PMBOK) can be used with PRINCE2.

PRINCE2 and PMP acknowledge each other's existence in their advertising material and attempt to position themselves as complementary products – PRINCE2 as a "methodology" and PMP as a "standard" – which can be used alongside each other. In practice, companies and practitioners choose one system or both depending on the project environment, their geographical location and costs involved.

See also
 Agile software development
 Comparison of project-management software
 Gantt chart
 List of project management topics
 Work breakdown structure

References

External links

 
 Guidelines for Managing Projects (fully consistent with PRINCE2) from the UK Department for Business, Enterprise and Regulatory Reform (BERR)
 PRINCE2.wiki

 
Project management certification